Pauline Curley (born 10 March 1969 in Birr) is an Irish marathon runner. At age thirty-nine, she represented Ireland for the 2008 Summer Olympics in Beijing, and competed in the women's marathon. She ran and finished the race in sixty-third place, with a time of 2:47:16. She also achieved her personal best, when she placed ninth at the 2008 Fortis Marathon in Rotterdam, Netherlands, with a time of 2:39:05. On 25 August 2013 she ran Longford Marathon, Ireland with a time of 2:44:22.

In October 2015 she was the fastest Irish woman in the Dublin marathon.

References

External links

NBC 2008 Olympics profile
 http://www.all-athletics.com/node/129580

Irish female marathon runners
Living people
People from Birr, County Offaly
Sportspeople from County Offaly
Olympic athletes of Ireland
Athletes (track and field) at the 2008 Summer Olympics
1969 births